Çişmäle Sap  is a rural locality (a selo) in Atninsky District, Tatarstan. The population was  305  as of 2010.

Geography                 
Çişmäle Sap is located  31 km north  of Olı Ätnä, district's administrative centre, and  100 km northeast  of Qazan, republic's capital, by road.

History                 
The village was established in 17th century.              
                
From 18th to the first half of the 19th centuries village's residents belonged to the social estate of state peasants.                
                
By the beginning of the twentieth century, village had  a mosque, 3 windmills, a blacksmith shop, a grain scourer and 4 small shops.               
                
Before the creation of the Tatar ASSR in 1920 was a part of Çar Uyezd of Qazan Governorate. Since 1920 was a part of Arça Canton; after the creation of districts in Tatar ASSR (Tatarstan) in Tuqay (1930–1935), Tuqay (former Qızıl Yul) (1935–1963), Arça (1963–1990) and Ätnä districts.

References

External links                 
  </ref>

Rural localities in Atninsky District